Proserpine may refer to:

 Proserpina, the Roman goddess of springtime and wife of Pluto

Arts and entertainment
 Proserpine (Lully), a 1680 opera by Jean-Baptiste Lully
 Proserpine (Paisiello), an 1803 opera by Giovanni Paisiello
 Proserpine (play), an 1820 verse drama by Mary Shelley and Percy Bysshe Shelley
 Proserpine (Saint-Saëns), an 1887 drame lyrique by Camille Saint-Saëns 
 Proserpine (Rossetti), a c. 1868 painting by Dante Gabriel Rossetti

Places
 Proserpine, Queensland, a town in Queensland, Australia
 Proserpine Airport, or Whitsunday Coast Airport
 Proserpine Cemetery
 Proserpine Hospital
 Proserpine River, a river in Queensland, Australia

Ships
 French ship Proserpine, any one of several ships of the French Navy
 HMS Proserpine, any one of several ships of the Royal Navy
 USS Proserpine (ARL-21), a United States Navy Achelous-class landing craft repair ship commissioned in 1945

See also
 Proserpin (Kraus), a 1781 opera by Joseph Martin Kraus
Proserpina (disambiguation)
Prosperine, Missouri